Sybille Gauvain (born 31 July 1994) is a French tennis player.

Gauvain made her WTA main draw debut at the 2018 Silicon Valley Classic in the doubles draw partnering Tamara Culibrk.

Gauvain has a career high WTA singles ranking of 980 achieved on 9 July 2012.

Gauvain played college tennis at San Jose State University.

References

External links
 
 

1994 births
Living people
French female tennis players
San Jose State Spartans women's tennis players